Raghunath Singh (1911 – 26 April 1992) was an Indian politician Indian National Congress leader and was the first Member of Parliament. He belongs to a village Khewali, Lok Sabha from Varanasi, being elected in 1952, 1957 and 1962. He was the Chairman of Hindustan Zinc Limited in 1968. He was the Chairman of Shipping Corporation of India in 1977. He was born in Khewali, Varanasi
and died on 26 April 1992 in Varanasi, India.

References

Indian National Congress politicians
Politicians from Varanasi
India MPs 1952–1957
India MPs 1957–1962
India MPs 1962–1967
Lok Sabha members from Uttar Pradesh
1911 births
1992 deaths
Indian National Congress politicians from Uttar Pradesh
People from Varanasi